Clara Whipple (née Clara or Clarissa or Clarise Brimmer Whipple; November 7, 1887 – November 6, 1932) was an American actress who flourished in theatre from 1913 to 1915 and in silent film from 1915 to 1919. She was also a silent film scenario writer.

Early years 
Whipple was born in Saint Louis. Sometime before 1910, she had attended school in Germany, on the wooded isle of Nönnenwerth, at Trier, and at Eschweiler.  Hildegard zur Bonsen (born 1889; Prussia) of Göttingen was her classmate and friend at all three locations.  Whipple's biography states that she was educated at a convent in Germany and a finishing school in Switzerland. A 1915 article in The St. Louis Star stated that Whipple left Saint Louis "early in life to go to a school in Ohio" (Ursuline Convent) "and later went to Ladycliff, on the Hudson." The article continued: "She then went to Nonnenwerth, a convent on an island in the Rhine, near Honnef."  "Later she went to Switzerland."  "She completed her education in the Women's College at Trier, in Germany."

Career

Stage 
Whipple, from 1913 to 1915, was a stage actress in Pittsburgh, where her father and mother had been living. Her father, Thomas Hearne Bailey Whipple, was a publicist and advertising executive with Westinghouse.  Whipple debuted in Pittsburgh June 1913 with the Harry Davis Players at the Grand Opera House in a production of The Christian, by Hall Caine.

Whipple subsequently, that same year, joined the Pitt Players, a stock company of the Pitt Theatre Company, founded in 1913, managed by William Moore Patch. At its founding, the Pitt Players were billed as "The Most Expensive and Evenly Balanced Stock Company in America."  Patch's mission was to offer new and original plays, as well as encourage native, and above all, Pittsburgh playwrights.

Film 

Whipple, from 1915 to 1919, was a silent film actress.  She co-starred in the film The Prima Donna's Husband (1916), a crime drama directed by William A. Brady, Julius Steger (es), and Joseph A. Golden (pt). The screenplay was written by Edna Riley, who adapted it from a play by Wildbrandt. The film, five reels, was released by Triumph Films. The film also featured Kathryn Brown Decker (née Browne; 1883–1919) and Holbrook Blinn.

Whipple was the leading lady in The Reapers (1916), starring opposite John B. Mason. The drama exemplified the biblical truth that, "As ye sow, so shall ye reap," from the Old Testament. The movie instructs about a high moral truth without preaching. Whipple was cast with Willard Mack and Gerda Holmes (née Gerda Helen Elfrida Henius; 1891–1943) in His One Big Chance (1916), a film directed by John Ince.

The Heart of a Hero (1916) was adapted from the Clyde Fitch play entitled Nathan Hale. Robert Warwick played the role of Hale, and Gail Kane performed the part of Alice Adams, his girlfriend. The theme of the American Revolution was made more true-to-life with the inclusion of Charles Jackson as Thomas Jefferson. Whipple played the Widow Chichester.

Whipple, Decker, and Blinn teamed again to make a powerful , Would You Forgive (1919). In Pettigrew's Girl (1919), her last film, she portrays Piggy, a chorus girl friend of heroine Daisy Heath. The leading lady was Ethel Clayton.

Family

Parents
Clara Brimmer Whipple was born November 7, 1887, in Saint Louis, Missouri, to the marriage of Thomas Hearne Bailey Whipple (1858–1942) and Frances (Fanny) Bell Mitchell (maiden; 1868–1941), who married January 25, 1887, in Columbia, Tennessee.  With her parents, Clara Whipple, in 1900, lived in Cleveland, and in 1910, in Pittsburgh.  In Pittsburgh T.H.B. Whipple had, for about 30 years, been a publicist with Westinghouse.  In 1926, he became an instructor of business communication at Duquesne University.  Clara's parents, T.H.B. and Frances, separated in 1907.  T.H.B. filed for divorce in June 1914 in Pittsburgh.  Clara's first and middle names are drawn from those of her great grandmother Clarissa Whipple (née Brimmer; 1783–1835) and her aunt, Clarissa Brimmer Whipple (1850–1914), who was twice married, first on February 6, 1881, in Manhattan, New York, to Frederick H. Prentiss (born 1856) (divorced between 1897 and 1900), then on March 2, 1900, in Pittsburgh to Burcham Harding (1852–1930).

Clara Whipple's father, T.H.B. Whipple, remarried May 4, 1923, to Laura Evangeline Williamson (maiden; 1884–1978).  From that marriage, Clara gained a half-sister, Frances Jane Whipple (born 1925), who in 1943, married Joseph John Kerchner (1920–2000).

Marriages 
On April 10, 1919, Whipple married motion picture director James Young, Jr., at the Mission Inn, Riverside, California.  For Young, it was his third of four marriages.  Whipple, at the time, was a well-regarded silent film scenario writer. James Young, from 1910 to 1917, had been married to the movie actress Clara Kimball Young – his second marriage. Clara Whipple retired from the screen after marrying James Young. She returned to movies as Clara Young in 1920, despite objections by Clara Kimball Young concerning the use of the Young name.

Whipple separated from Young in June 1920 and divorced him in October 1921. The couple had a home at 2000 Holly Drive, Los Angeles, California. Young settled money and real estate amounting to $40,000 on Whipple.

In September 1922 Young sought to reverse the annulment with a cross-complaint filed by his attorneys. Depositions mentioned misconduct by Whipple with other men. Jack Pickford, Thomas J. Moore, Texas Guinan, and Doris Pawn were named in Young's preliminary moves. On October 12, 1922, a day before Whipple became entitled to her divorce decree, Young filed a $50,000 slander suit against her. The legal action came in response to Whipple's accusations that Young threatened her, pointed guns at her, and offered her $2,000 to return his Ku Klux Klan membership paper and bundles of correspondence he had received from women.  A month later, in early December 1922, James Young became seriously ill of auto-intoxication in December 1922.

Clara Whipple married again, to Charles J. Dewey (born 1883).  They were married in Omaha in September 1928.

Death 
Clara Whipple Dewey died November 6, 1932, in Manhattan, New York, a little more than two months after her brother, "Jamie" Whipple (né James Cameron Mitchell Whipple; 1892–1980), became Production Manager for NBC in Chicago. The cause of death was "Carcinoma of the Liver." Her residence at the time of her death was 180 Claremont Avenue, where her brother James lived, in the Morningside Heights neighborhood of Manhattan – less than 2 blocks north of the where Juilliard had been located from 1910 to 1969.

Extended family 
Armide Whipple (née Armide Nana Edith Whipple; 1920–2001) – Clara Whipple's niece, daughter of Jamie Whipple and Armide Whipple (née Armide Ana Cecile Marie Ayraud; 1901–1976) – was a jazz and big band vocalist with the orchestras of Jimmie Grier (né James Wilford Grier; 1902–1959), Chico Marx, Les Brown, and Ben Pollack.  She sang under the stagename "Kim Kimberly." She was briefly married, from about 1939 to about 1943, to big band trumpeter Bobby Clark (né Robert Charles Clark, Jr.; 1916–1981).

Other litigation 
Adelbert George Volck, who worked in the film industry, rented Whipple's Holly Drive home. She brought a suit against Volck in September 1923, charging him with damaging household furnishings, in particular her tapestries and draperies. The court had to decide whether the tapestries and draperies were imported, and therefore valuable, as Whipple contended.

Whipple filed suit for the collection of a promissory note from motion picture producer Dale Hanshaw in October 1925. She asked for $566.50, the same amount she claimed to have advanced Hanshaw, in various sums, around June 18, 1923. At the time of the court action, Hanshaw had made only a single payment of $50. He had given Whipple a radio as security, which she sold, and applied the proceeds to the payment of the note. $56 of the amount Whipple requested was for interest.

Extant productions and works

As writer

Stage acting 
The Harry Davis Players

The Pitt Players
 Double bill (5 & 6)
 Frederick Esmelton (director)

Other productions

Silent film acting 
Mutual Film Corporation

Connes-Till Film Company, Toronto
B C Feature Film Company (distributor)
George Brownridge (general manager)

Equitable Motion Picture Corporation (production company)

Other films

Lost film 
Equitable Motion Picture Corporation

Gallery

Notes and references

Notes

Inline citations

General references 

 "Clara Whipple" (illustrated), Moving Picture World, Vol. 25, No. 10, September 4, 1915, p. 1657
 "Picture Actresses Want Club," Moving Picture World, Vol. 25, No. 12, September 18, 1915, p. 2003
 "How Clara Whipple Was  Moving Picture World, Vol. 26, No. 4, October 23, 1915, p. 591
 "Clara Whipple in Ingenue Role," Moving Picture World, Vol. 27, No. 4, January 22, 1916, p. 612
 "World Film Reorganizes," Moving Picture World, Vol. 27, No. 6, February 12, 1916, p. 931
 "World-Equitable Players," Moving Picture World, Vol. 27, No. 7, February 19, 1916, p. 1133
 "Miss Whipple Claims 'Vampire' Record," Moving Picture World, Vol. 27, No. 11, March 18, 1916, p. 1831
 "Film Flashes," Variety, Vol. 42, No. 7, April 14, 2016, p. 22
 "News Notes From Movieland" (Central Press Association syndicated Sunday column), by Daisy Dean (pseudonym), Lima Times Democrat April 19, 1916, p. 4Paragraph: "Willard Mack, Gerda Holmes, Clara Whipple " (in reference to the 1916 film, His One Big Chance)(née Gerda Helen Elfrida Henius; 1891–1943)(accessible via Ancestry.com)
 "News Notes From Movieland" (Central Press Association syndicated Sunday column), by Daisy Dean (pseudonym), Racine Journal-News, May 13, 1916, p. 12 (accessible via )
 
 
 
 "James Young to Wed," Moving Picture World, Vol. 40, No. 2, April 12, 1919, p. 218
 "Young–Whipple," Moving Picture World, Vol. 40, No. 4, April 26, 1919, p. 519
 
 
 "Sued for Divorce," Moving Picture World, Vol. 51, No. 8, August 20, 1921, p. 793

External links 
 
 
 

1887 births
1932 deaths
Deaths from liver cancer
American silent film actresses
20th-century American writers
Actresses from Missouri
20th-century American actresses
Writers from Mississippi
20th-century American women writers